Pingston Creek is a stream in the U.S. state of Washington.

Pingston Creek was named after Alfred G. Pingston, a pioneer settler.

See also
List of rivers of Washington

References

Rivers of Stevens County, Washington
Rivers of Washington (state)